Joseph Samuel Ozomer Godin (September 20, 1907 – March 8, 1975) was a professional ice hockey player who played 66 games in the National Hockey League.  He would play with the Ottawa Senators and Montreal Canadiens. He was born in Rockland, Ontario. He died in 1975.

References

External links

1907 births
1975 deaths
Canadian ice hockey right wingers
Franco-Ontarian people
Ice hockey people from Ontario
Montreal Canadiens players
Ottawa Senators (1917) players
Ottawa Senators (original) players
People from Clarence-Rockland